Aurélio de Sousa Soares (born 18 April 1974) is an Angolan former professional footballer who played as a centre-back. He played in 22 matches for the Angola national team from 1994 to 1999. He was also named in Angola's squad for the 1998 African Cup of Nations tournament.

References

External links
 
 

1974 births
Living people
Angolan footballers
Association football central defenders
Angola international footballers
1998 African Cup of Nations players
Girabola players
Primeira Liga players
C.D. Primeiro de Agosto players
Atlético Petróleos de Luanda players
Associação Académica de Coimbra – O.A.F. players
Angolan expatriate footballers
Angolan expatriate sportspeople in Portugal
Expatriate footballers in Portugal
People from Benguela